San Giusto Abbey may refer to:

San Giusto Abbey, Tuscania, a monastery near Tuscania, Province of Viterbo, Lazio, Italy
Abbey of San Giusto, Carmignano, a church in Carmignano, Province of Prato, Tuscany, Italy

Religious buildings and structures disambiguation pages